Drepanotylus is a genus of  dwarf spiders that was first described by Å. Holm in 1945.

Species
 it contains five species:
Drepanotylus aduncus Sha & Zhu, 1995 – China
Drepanotylus borealis Holm, 1945 – Scandinavia, Russia (Europe to Far East)
Drepanotylus holmi (Eskov, 1981) – Russia (West Siberia to Far East), Mongolia
Drepanotylus pirinicus Deltshev, 1992 – Bulgaria
Drepanotylus uncatus (O. Pickard-Cambridge, 1873) (type) – Europe, Russia (Europe to West Siberia)

See also
 List of Linyphiidae species (A–H)

References

Araneomorphae genera
Linyphiidae
Spiders of Asia